John Blackledge  is the current ISKA UK National Director of Referees and Officials and a former world champion kickboxer. He is also a 7th Dan in Goju Ryu Karate and a Kung Fu Sifu, specialising in  Pak Mei Wu Chi Yun Style after learning under Sifu George Taylor and late 
Master Lee Chang

References

External links
 International Sport Kickboxing Association

 Pak Mei Wu Chi Yun Homepage

Living people
English male kickboxers
Kickboxing referees
Year of birth missing (living people)